Ria Verschuren (born September 19, 1949) is a former Dutch slalom canoeist who competed in the 1970s. She won a bronze medal in the mixed C-2 event with her former husband Peter van Stipdonk at the 1973 ICF Canoe Slalom World Championships in Muotathal.

References

 
1949 births
Living people
Dutch female canoeists
Medalists at the ICF Canoe Slalom World Championships
20th-century Dutch women